Kingenidae is a family of brachiopods belonging to the order Terebratulida.

Genera

The following genera are included in Kingenidae:
 Aldingia Thomson, 1916
 Belothyris Smirnova, 1960
 Dictyothyropsis Barczyk, 1969
 Dzirulina  Nutsubidze, 1945
 Kingena Davidson, 1852
 Paraldingia Richardson, 1973
 Waconella  Owen, 1970
 Zeuschneria Smirnova, 1975
 Zittelina Rollier, 1919

References

Brachiopods